Eversheds Sutherland is a global multinational law practice created by a combination of law firms Eversheds LLP and Sutherland Asbill & Brennan LLP, in February 2017, and is one of the 50 largest law practices in the world.

History

1988 to 2000
Following initial discussions in 1988, Eversheds was originally established in 1989 by a joint venture between Manchester-based Alexander Tatham & Co, Norwich-based Daynes Hill & Perks, Birmingham-based Evershed Wells & Hind, Newcastle upon Tyne-based Ingledew Botterell  and Cardiff-based Philips & Buck. In 1990 the firm merged with Leeds-based Hepworth & Chadwick. In 1991, the firm merged with Ipswich-based Turner Martin & Symes. In 1992, the firm rebranded all of its member firms with the prefix "Eversheds", the names of which were all shortened to just Eversheds in 1995. Eversheds merged with Bristol-based Holt Philips in 1994 and the London, Jersey and Brussels offices of Jacques & Lewis in 1995. In 1996 Eversheds Consulting was formed. In May 1996, the insurance, corporate and property groups of London-based Waltons & Morse joined Eversheds. In August 1997 Eversheds merged with Newcastle upon Tyne-based Wilkinson Maughan. In May 1998, Eversheds formed an alliance with Copenhagen-based Sandal Lunoe and acquired the London, Paris, Sofia and Moscow offices of Frere Cholmeley Bischoff. In November 1998, Eversheds merged with Cambridge-based Palmer Wheeldon. In 2000, Eversheds merged with Newcastle upon Tyne-based Linsley & Mortimer, and financially integrated all of its UK offices.

2000 to 2010
Eversheds merged the activities of its Bristol and Cardiff offices in 2001 and simultaneously closed the Bristol office. In 2002 Eversheds formed an alliance with Italian firm Piergrossi Villa Bianchini Riccardi. In 2003 Eversheds became Eversheds LLP, a limited liability partnership. It also transferred its Monaco office to Lawrence Graham and formed an association with Qatari firm Al-Jufairi. In 2004 Eversheds formed an alliance with Malaysian firm Shahrizat Rashid & Lee and associated with Austrian firm Lambert, Hungarian firm Sándor Szegedi Szent-Ivány Komáromi and Spanish firm Lupicinio. Eversheds formed alliances with Swedish firm Andrén Bratt Partners, German firm Heisse Kursawe and Polish firm Wierzbowski i Wspólnicy in 2005. Also in 2005 was the incorporation of Eversheds International Limited. In 2006 Eversheds was granted a licence to open an office in Shanghai, China, formed an association with Irish firm O'Donnell Sweeney and became the first international law firm to be awarded an operating licence in the Qatar Financial Centre in Doha, Qatar. Also in 2006, Eversheds alliance with Baier Lambert in Austria was terminated and replaced by an alliance with a new firm, Lambert Eversheds. In 2007 Eversheds associated with Czech firm Balcar Polanský, Estonian firm Ots & Co, Latvian firm Baltmane & Bitans and Lithuanian firm Saladzius & Partners. In 2008, the Paris office, Eversheds Frere Cholmeley, overcame regulatory issues and re-branded itself as Eversheds. Also in 2008, Eversheds was granted a licence to operate in Abu Dhabi, United Arab Emirates and associated with Netherlands-based Faasen and Partners, South Africa-based Routledge Modise and Switzerland-based Schmid. In September 2008 Eversheds announced that the activities of its Norwich and Cambridge offices would be merged and the Norwich office closed. Eversheds opened offices in Edinburgh, Hong Kong and Singapore in 2009. Between 2008 and 2010 Eversheds had four rounds of redundancies and cut a total of around 730 jobs, the largest staff reductions of any UK-based law firm in that period.

2010 to 2016
In February 2011 Eversheds parted with its Spanish alliance partner Lupicinio Abogados citing strategic differences, and shortly afterwards formed a new alliance with Spanish law firm Nicea Abogados. In May 2011 Eversheds merged with the law consortium KSLG, which comprised Dhabaan & Partners in Saudi Arabia; Khasawneh & Associates in the UAE; and Sanad Law Group in Jordan and Iraq. In October 2011 the Romanian firm Lina & Guia joined the Eversheds International network, becoming known as Eversheds Lina & Guia, although not integrating fully into Eversheds LLP. In November 2011 Eversheds' Dublin office, Eversheds O'Donnell Sweeney, re-branded as "Eversheds".

In 2012, Lambert Eversheds rebranded to Eversheds. The offices in Amman, Baghdad, Dubai and Riyadh, previously "in association with Eversheds KSLG" rebranded to "in association with Eversheds".

In 2013 Eversheds split from its South African arm, which rebranded to its former name, Routledge Modise. Eversheds opened a new office in Beijing. Eversheds opened its seventh Middle East office, and second Iraqi office, located in Erbil. Eversheds opened its first African office in Tunisia. Eversheds El Heni became a member of the Eversheds African Law Institute (EALI). Eversheds Faasen in the Netherlands re-branded to Eversheds B.V.

In December 2013 Eversheds announced a tie up with South African medium-sized law firm, Mahons Attorneys, giving Eversheds bases in Johannesburg, Cape Town and in Mauritius.

In 2014, Heisse Kursawe Eversheds opened an office in Berlin. Eversheds in South Africa merged with Knight Turner resulting in a third South African office in Durban. Eversheds formed an association with Juridia Bützow which became JB Eversheds in Finland with a national coverage of five offices, located in Hämeenlinna, Helsinki, Jyväskylä, Tampere and Turku.

In 2015, JB Eversheds opened its sixth office in Finland in Pori. Heisse Kursawe Eversheds merged with Eversheds. Eversheds opened an office in Belfast, Northern Ireland. The Finnish offices re-branded from JB Eversheds to Eversheds Asianajotoimisto Oy / Eversheds Attorneys Ltd. Eversheds Bianchini rebranded to Eversheds - Associazione Professionale trading as "Eversheds". In Romania, Eversheds Lina & Guia rebranded to Eversheds.

On 29 November 2016 it was announced that Eversheds was in late stage merger talks with the U.S. firm Sutherland Asbill & Brennan. The merger would create the 39th largest firm by revenue globally, and push Eversheds into the top 10 law firms in the UK, where it will rank tenth largest. On 16 December 2016 Eversheds announced that the merger was approved and the new firm would start operating under the name Eversheds Sutherland starting 1 February 2017.

2017 to present
As of January 2023, Eversheds Sutherland has more than 3,000 lawyers with a global footprint spanning over 70 offices in more than 30 countries. In addition, a network of more than 200 related firms, including formalized alliances in Latin America, Asia Pacific and Africa, provide support around the globe. For more information, visit: https://www.eversheds-sutherland.com/global/en/who/about-us/index.page

Notes

References

External links
 
 
 

Law firms of the United Kingdom
Law firms established in 1988
1988 establishments in the United Kingdom
Law firms of Wales
Law firms based in Cardiff
Law firms established in 2017
Law firms established in 1924
1924 establishments in the United Kingdom
2017 establishments in the United Kingdom
Foreign law firms with offices in the Netherlands
Foreign law firms with offices in Hong Kong